Lubomír Blaha (born 28 March 1978) is a Czech former professional football player. He was born in Uherský Brod. Blaha played in Scotland for Aberdeen; he signed for them in March 2005 and left in May 2005 after making eight appearances.

References

External links
 
 

1978 births
Living people
Czech footballers
Czech expatriate footballers
Czech First League players
FC Baník Ostrava players
1. FC Slovácko players
AC Sparta Prague players
FC Slovan Liberec players
FC Kuban Krasnodar players
FK Viktoria Žižkov players
FC Fastav Zlín players
FK Dukla Prague players
FC Spartak Trnava players
FC Viktoria Plzeň players
Aberdeen F.C. players
Expatriate footballers in Russia
Expatriate footballers in Slovakia
Expatriate footballers in Scotland
Expatriate footballers in Austria
Slovak Super Liga players
Scottish Premier League players
Czech expatriate sportspeople in Slovakia
Czech expatriate sportspeople in Russia
Czech expatriate sportspeople in Scotland
Czech expatriate sportspeople in Austria
Association football forwards
People from Uherský Brod
Sportspeople from the Zlín Region